On Suffocation is a 2013 Swedish short film directed by Jenifer Malmqvist. The film was shown on the 2013 Sundance Film Festival and broadcast by ARTE on October 17, 2014. It won Best Short Film 2014 the Guldbagge Awards.

Plot 
In Iran, two young men are hanged for being homosexual, a sex crime.

Reception 

Betsy Sharkey of the Los Angeles Times called it a "wordless triumph".

At the 2014 Guldbagge Awards, On Suffocation won Best Short Film.

References

External links 
 
 On Suffocation at Sundance Film Festival
 On Suffocation at anagram.se
 http://www.herfilmproject.com/blog/sundance-day-3-swedish-filmmaker-jenifer-malmqvists-short-film-on-suffocation
 http://afifest.afi.com/sections/T1580

2013 films
2013 short films
Swedish short films
Swedish LGBT-related films
LGBT in Iran
Films about capital punishment
Films set in Iran
2010s Swedish films